The East and Central Africa Cricket Conference was a regional body which organised cricket teams from Malawi, Tanzania, Uganda, and Zambia.

It ceased to exist in 1997 with the formation of the African Cricket Association, which now oversees all cricket administration across the African continent.

The East African Cricket Conference was probably at its strongest in the 1970s when the EACC organised the East African Cricket Team with members from Kenya, Tanzania, and Uganda. The team was invited to, and participated in the 1975 Cricket World Cup. The team continued to be an associate member of the ICC until being replaced by the East and Central African cricket team in 1989.

The East and Central African cricket team continued to have ICC associate membership until 2003, when each of the member nations joined the ICC separately as independent members of the African Cricket Association.

Members

References

External links
 ICC region page

Cricket administration
Cric
Cricket in Africa
Cricket in East Africa